The R317 road is a regional road in County Mayo in Ireland.

The government legislation that defines the R317, the Roads Act 1993 (Classification of Regional Roads) Order 2012 (Statutory Instrument 54 of 2012), provides the following official description:

Newport — Boggy, County Mayo

Between its junction with N59 at Georges Street Newport and its junction with R312 at Boggy via Knockmoyle and Bracklagh all in the county of Mayo.

See also
 List of roads of County Mayo
 National primary road
 National secondary road
 Regional road
 Roads in Ireland

References

Regional roads in the Republic of Ireland
Roads in County Mayo